Sondre Brunstad Fet (born 17 January 1997) is a Norwegian professional footballer who plays as a midfielder for Eliteserien side Bodø/Glimt.

Career
Brunstad Fet started his career in Sykkylven, representing the senior team. In 2013, he joined the regional great team Aalesund, and made his league debut as a 90th-minute substitute in August 2014 against Haugesund, and made on successful pass out of one attempt.

He has represented Norway as a youth international.

On 29 May 2020, Brunstad Fet joined Eliteserien side Bodø/Glimt, on a season-long loan. On 27 October 2020, he signed contract to 2023 for Bodø/Glimt.

Career statistics

Club

Honours
Bodø/Glimt
Eliteserien: 2020, 2021

References

1997 births
Living people
People from Sykkylven
Sportspeople from Ålesund
Norwegian footballers
Association football midfielders
Norway youth international footballers
Eliteserien players
Aalesunds FK players
FK Bodø/Glimt players